The 1964 United States presidential election in Wisconsin was held on November 3, 1964 as part of 1964 United States presidential election. State voters chose 12 electors to the Electoral College, who voted for president and vice president.

Background
Politics in Wisconsin since the Populist movement had been dominated by the Republican Party, as the upper classes, along with the majority of workers who followed them, fled from William Jennings Bryan's agrarian and free silver sympathies. Competition between the "League" under Robert M. La Follette, and the conservative "Regular" faction would develop into the Wisconsin Progressive Party in the late 1930s, which was opposed to the conservative German Democrats and to the national Republican Party, and allied with Franklin D. Roosevelt at the federal level. During the two wartime elections, the formerly Democratic German counties in the east of the state – which had been powerfully opposed to the Civil War because they saw it as a "Yankee" war and opposed the military draft instituted during it – viewed Communism as a much greater threat to America than Nazism and consequently opposed President Roosevelt's war effort. Consequently, these historically Democratic counties became virtually the most Republican in the entire state, and became a major support base for populist conservative Senator Joe McCarthy, who became notorious for his investigations into Communists inside the American government. The state's populace's opposition to Communism and the Korean War turned Wisconsin strongly to Republican nominee Dwight D. Eisenhower in the 1952 and 1956 presidential elections.

The 1958 midterm elections, however, saw a major change in Wisconsin politics, as Gaylord A. Nelson became only the state's second Democratic Governor since 1895, and the state also elected Democrats to the position of treasurer and Senator, besides that party gaining a majority in the State Assembly for only the second time since the middle 1890s. They maintained a close balance in the early 1960s, signalling the state's transition to a swing state.

Vote

During the Republican primaries, Wisconsin supported favorite son John W. Byrnes but no other state joined him. Ultimate Republican nominee Barry Goldwater considered Wisconsin a useful state to combine with his Southern and Western strategy for winning the presidency and directing the GOP away from the declining Yankee Northeast. The Republican would campaign in Wisconsin late in September, but met with severe hostility at the University of Wisconsin-Madison. Signs saying "Bring the Bomb—Back Barry" were common in Madison.

Early polls nevertheless showed incumbent President Lyndon B. Johnson leading Goldwater comfortably, despite predictions of a severe backlash to the Civil Rights Act from Wisconsin's anti-black German-American and Polish-American populations. Extreme fears of financial loss for farmers accounted for a 66—28 lead for Johnson in September, and fear of Goldwater's policy of strategic use of nuclear weapons, rather than enthusiasm for the domestic and foreign policies of President Johnson, was cited as the cause of the President's continuing strong lead one month later.

Ultimately, Wisconsin would vote strongly for President Johnson, who defeated Goldwater by a margin of 24.35 percent - a large margin though considerably less than some early polls had expected. Goldwater held up slightly better in the German areas where conservative Republicanism had been established by anti-World War II sentiment, whilst he lost heavily in the Yankee counties of the south. , this is the last election in which Dodge County, Fond du Lac County, Green Lake County, Ozaukee County, Vilas County, Washington County, and Waukesha County (and by that extension, any of the WOW counties) voted for a Democratic presidential candidate.

Results

Results by county

See also
 United States presidential elections in Wisconsin

References

Wisconsin
1964
1964 Wisconsin elections